Cornwells Heights is a census-designated place located in Bensalem Township in Bucks County, Pennsylvania, United States.  The community was formerly part of Cornwells Heights-Eddington, but was split into two separate CDPs.  As of the 2010 census, the population was 1,391. The Cornwells Heights train station, with a park-and-ride with access to Interstate 95, serves SEPTA Regional Rail's Trenton Line and Amtrak's Keystone Service and Northeast Regional service along the Northeast Corridor.

Demographics

References

Census-designated places in Bucks County, Pennsylvania
Census-designated places in Pennsylvania